FADS Fun Sticks, formerly known as FAGS, and later FADS, are a brand of candy cigarette made by Riviera Confectionery (a division of Fyna Foods Australia) in Victoria, Australia. First produced as FAGS (formerly used as British/Australian slang for cigarettes) in 1943, during the 1990s, the product was renamed FADS amidst concerns of it promoting smoking to children, as well as pejorative connotations of the word. During the 2000s, "Fun Sticks" was added to the name to further distance the product from its connection to cigarettes.

The original candies were modelled after cigarettes, thin white sticks with a red tip to resemble a lit end. The red tip was later removed during the 1990s with the name change.

Today, Fads are manufactured in Colombia rather than Australia as they were originally.

References

Australian confectionery